Epischnia hesperidella is a species of snout moth in the genus Epischnia. It was described by Rebel in 1917. It is found on the Canary Islands.

References

Moths described in 1917
Phycitini